Scrobipalpa ochromaculata is a moth in the family Gelechiidae. It was described by Daniel Lucas in 1950. It is found in Tunisia.

References

Scrobipalpa
Moths described in 1950